Sarpa Kavu (meaning Abode of Snakes) or Naga Banna is a traditional natural sacred space seen near traditional homes in Kerala state of South India and in the region of Tulunad. The site is believed to be inhabited by snakes, and the area usually contains a representation of Naga Raja (King of the Snakes) and other Naga Devatas (snake deities), where offerings and rites are performed during special ceremonies. This is a Hindu ritual performed by the Nagavanshi Kshatriya sects like the Bunts and Nairs, and all castes hold the Sarpa Kavu in reverence, with access forbidden to the area unless for due ceremonies.

Origin
Mythology says that Kerala was created from the Arabian Sea and given to the Brahmins (Namboothiris) as a "donation" by Parasurama to save himself from the sins of killing numerous Kshathriya kings. The land was full of forests and poisonous snakes were found in plenty. So the Brahmins refused to stay there. Parasurama requested Lord Shiva to provide a solution. Shiva told Parasurama to start worshipping Anantha the king of snakes. Parasurama did so and Anantha advised him to start snake worship in Kerala and provide some forest especially for snakes in the form of Sarppakkavu (Snake forests). Parasurama later installed the idols of Anantha and Vasuki at Vettikkottu (near Kayamkulam in Alappuzha district) and Mannarassala (near Harippadu in Alappuzha district) and started worshipping them. The Brahmins also worshipped Anantha and Vasuki and the pleased snake gods made Kerala suitable for living.

Other usage
Sarpa Kavus even help in soil and water conservation besides preserving its rich biological wealth. The ponds and streams adjoining the groves are perennial water sources. These are the last resorts to many of the animals and birds for their water requirements, especially during summer. Sacred groves also enrich the soil through its rich litter composition. The nutrients generated thus are not only recycled within the sacred grove ecosystem but also find their way into the adjoining agro-eco systems.

See also
 
 Culture of Kerala
 Mannarasala Temple
 Naga (mythology)
 Nairs
 Religions of Kerala
 Serpent (symbolism)
 Snake worship

References

External links

More about Sarpa Kavu.

Hinduism in Kerala
Objects used in Hindu worship
Hindu snake worship
Hindu mythology